Bolbelasmus minor is a species of beetle in the family Geotrupidae. It is found in North America.

References

Further reading

 
 
 

Bolboceratidae